Charles August Kraus (August 15, 1875 – June 27, 1967) was an American chemist. He was professor of chemistry and director of the chemical laboratories at Clark University, where he directed the Chemical Warfare Service during World War I.

Later, he became professor of chemistry and director of the chemical laboratories at Brown University, and was a consultant to the Manhattan Project to develop the atomic bomb. His research contributed to the development of the ultraviolet lamp, to pyrex, and to the production of a leaded form of ethyl gasoline. He investigated the electrical conductance of liquid ammonia alkali metal solutions contributing to the development of the concept of solvated electron. He published more than 225 research papers.

He was a member of the National Academy of Sciences, American Academy of Sciences, American Philosophical Society, American Chemical Society, American Physical Society, American Association of University Professors, Faraday Society,
Washington Academy of Sciences, and an Honorary Fellow of the Franklin Institute.

Awards
He was awarded several medals from the American Chemical Society, including the Priestley Medal in 1950.  He was awarded the Franklin Medal in 1938, the Navy Distinguished Public Service Award in 1948, and the Willard Gibbs Award in 1935.

References
Mitchell, Martha. Encyclopedia Brunoniana. 1993.
 Servos, John W., Physical chemistry from Ostwald to Pauling : the making of a science in America, Princeton, N.J. : Princeton University Press, 1990.

External links
National Academy of Sciences Biographical Memoir

Kraus, Charles A.
1875 births
1967 deaths
Recipients of the Navy Distinguished Public Service Award
Members of the United States National Academy of Sciences
University of Kansas alumni
Massachusetts Institute of Technology alumni
Brown University faculty
Fellows of the American Physical Society